Nomi (and its variant Noomi) is a name which is used as a unisex given name and a surname. People with the name include:

Given name
 Nomi Abadi, American-Egyptian Jewish pianist and actress
 Nomi Eve (born 1968), American fiction writer
 Nomi Fernandes (born 1985), Swiss model
 Nomi Kaplan (born 1933), Lithuanian-Canadian photographer 
 Nomi Prins, American journalist
 Noomi Rapace (born 1979), Swedish actress
 Nomi Ruiz (born 1986), American singer, songwriter, actress, essayist and producer
 Nomi Stomphorst (born 1992), Dutch water polo player
 Nomi no Sukune (野見 宿禰), Japanese sumo wrestler
 Nomi Talisman (born 1966), Israeli-born American film director

Surname
 Klaus Nomi (1944–1983), German countertenor
 , Japanese journalist
 , Japanese actor
 , Japanese composer

Unisex given names